Wiseman is a census-designated place (CDP) in Yukon-Koyukuk Census Area, Alaska, United States. The full time resident population is 12 as of 2022.

Wiseman is a small mining community along the Middle Fork Koyukuk River in the Brooks Range. It was founded by gold miners who abandoned the Slate Creek (later Coldfoot) settlement around 1908.

Robert Marshall, who became a prominent American forester, preservation activist, and a co-founder of The Wilderness Society, wrote the bestselling book, Arctic Village, about his 15-month stay in this frontier town around the year 1930. Marshall described Wiseman and the Koyukuk River area surrounding it, as "the happiest civilization of which I have knowledge." Marshall called Noel Wien's first flight there on 5 May 1925, "one of the great events in Koyukuk history."

Geography
Wiseman is located at  (67.433355, -150.094376).

The town is bisected by Wiseman Creek.

Climate
Wiseman has a subarctic climate (Köppen Dfc). Summers are short and mild, with frequent rainy days and cool nights. Winters are long and severely cold. Annual snowfall averages 82 inches (208 cm) with a maximum monthly snowfall of 18.2 inches (46 cm) occurring during the month of February.

Demographics

Wiseman first appeared on the 1930 U.S. Census as an unincorporated village. It returned again in 1940. It did not appear again until the 1990 census when it was designated an Alaskan Native Village Statistical Area (ANVSA), although most of the residents were non-Native. In 2000, it was made a census-designated place (CDP).

As of the census of 2000, there were 21 people, 7 households, and 3 families residing in the CDP. The population density was 0.3 people per square mile (0.1/km2). There were 30 housing units at an average density of 0.4/sq mi (0.1/km2). The racial makeup of the CDP was 81% White, and 19% Native American.

There were 7 households, out of which 4 (60%) had children under the age of 18 living with them, 4 (60%) were married couples living together, and 3 (40%) were non-families. 3 (40%) of all households were made up of individuals, and none (0%) had someone living alone who was 65 years of age or older. The average household size was 3.0 and the average family size was 4.5.

In the CDP, the population was spread out, with 8 (40%) under the age of 18, 2 (10%) from 18 to 24, 9 (40%) from 25 to 44, 2 (10%) from 45 to 64, and none (0%) aged 65 and over. The median age was 34 years. For every 100 females, there were 130 males.  [9 females, 12 males]. For every 100 females age 18 and over, there were 160 males.  [5 females, 8 males].

The median income for a household in the CDP was $23,750, and the median income for a family was $24,583. Males had a median income of $0 versus $11,250 for females. The per capita income for the CDP was $8,211.  There were no families and 10% of the population living below the poverty line, including no under eighteens and none of those over 64.

Education
The community was previously served by a school of the Yukon–Koyukuk School District.

Films
Zoltan Szalkai produced a film entitled Wise Men of Alaska (2000), shot in Wiseman village.
Gates of the Arctic: Alaska's Brooks Range (2007)
Life Below Zero features Wiseman

References

External links

 Wiseman photos
 Wiseman Kennel

Census-designated places in Alaska
Census-designated places in Unorganized Borough, Alaska
Census-designated places in Yukon–Koyukuk Census Area, Alaska
Populated places of the Arctic United States